Sue Roberts (born June 22, 1948) is an American professional golfer who played on the LPGA Tour.

Roberts won four times on the LPGA Tour between 1974 and 1976.

Professional wins

LPGA Tour wins (4)

 The 1974 Southgate Ladies Open was shortened to 36 holes due to inclement weather. Since a playoff was not possible, Roberts and Jane Blalock were declared co-champions.

References

External links

American female golfers
LPGA Tour golfers
Golfers from Illinois
Sportspeople from Oak Park, Illinois
1948 births
Living people
21st-century American women